Effingham Junction Traincare depot stables Class 455 electric multiple units operated by South Western Railway. It is mainly a train shed, but it is classed as a depot. Freight trains are also stabled here occasionally.

Location
The depot is right by Effingham Junction railway station.

References

Railway depots in England
Stagecoach Group